Cattouse is a surname. Notable people with the surname include:

Kaya Cattouse (born 1990), Belizean cyclist
Nadia Cattouse (born 1924), British actress, singer, and songwriter
Ray Cattouse (born 1952), British boxer
Sean Cattouse (born 1988), American football player